Aleidis Raiscop (also Reiscop, Raeskop; 1449 in Goch — 15 December 1507 at Rolandswerth monastery) was a German Benedictine monk and a writer. She is known for her philological and German-Latin translation capabilities.

From a young age she was taught Latin — either at the grammar school in Goch, or at the grammar school in Uedem which was funded by her great-uncle Heinrich Raiscop. She was a pupil to Bruder Benediktus von Maria Laach and at the age of 16 joined the Hagenbusch monastery in Xanten. Later, in 1467, she relocated as a master scholar to the monastery in Rolandswerth (now called Nonnenwerth). On 15 December 1507 she died based at the same monastery.

Influence 
During her life she composed seven Latin homilies about Paul the Apostle, translated a German composition about Holy Mass into Latin, and became renowned as a writer of Classics at the monastery. Her particular talent was being able to compose perfect translations of German texts into Latin. Johannes Butzbach, a fellow Classics enthusiast, often praised Aleidis' works highly. His book from 1505 titled De illustribus mulieribus ("On Distinguished Women") was dedicated to her, in which he compares her to other Benedictine monks such as Hildegard of Bingen.

Raiscop was also one of few nuns in the monastery at the time, and it has been suggested that exemplary skills marked a high point for the perception of nuns at the time. Around this time, nuns began to earn merit for their handicraft works and copying of books.

In 1932 the town of Goch dedicated a street name to Raiscop (but spelled Reiscop) located between Gerbergstraße and Feldstraße.

Further reading 

 Heinrich Joseph Floß: Das Kloster Rolandswerth. In: Annalen des Historischen Vereins für den Niederrhein 19 (1868), p. 76–219
 Kossert, Karl. Aleydis Raiscop - Die Humanistin von Nonnenwerth. Gocher Schriften 6
 Kossert, Dr. Karl. Die elf Distichen des Jakob Siberte auf die Nonne Aleydis Raiscop. In: Kalender für das Klever Land auf das Jahr 1982, p. 132–134.
 Vleugel, Clara van der. „Wer war Raiscop?“ In: An Niers und Kendel, Issue 5/1981, p. 20.

References 

Benedictine saints
15th-century German women writers
1449 births
1507 deaths